Kentucky Route 351 (KY 351) is a  state highway in the U.S. state of Kentucky. The highway connects mostly rural areas of Henderson County with Henderson.

Route description
KY 351 begins at an intersection with US 41 Alt./US 60 (North Green Street) in the west-central part of Henderson, within Henderson County, where the roadway continues as 2nd Street. It travels to the southeast and crosses over some railroad tracks of CSX and the North Fork Canoe Creek before it passes North Middle School. It intersects the northern terminus of KY 2084 and then has an interchange with US 41 and the northern terminus of the Pennyrile Parkway (future Interstate 69 (I-69)). It passes Henderson County High School before it intersects the western terminus of KY 1539 (Larue Road). The highway passes East Heights Elementary School just before it leaves the city limits of Henderson. In Graham Hill, it intersects the southern terminus of KY 2183 (Holloway Lane). It crosses over a drainage ditch and curves to the east before it enters Zion. There, it has a brief concurrency with KY 1078. The highway heads to the east-southeast and then back to the southeast. It crosses over Lick Creek before intersecting the northern terminus of KY 2249 (C. N. Tillotson Road). It passes Hebbardsville School and curves to the east-northeast. It curves back to the east-southeast, passes the Sandy Lee Watkins Henderson County Park and crosses over a drainage ditch before it curves back to the southeast. KY 351 enters Hebbardsville, where it meets its eastern terminus, an intersection with KY 416.

Major intersections

See also

References

0351
Transportation in Henderson County, Kentucky